Yang di-Pertuan Negara (English: (he) who is Lord of the State) is a title for the head of state in certain Malay-speaking countries, and has been used as an official title at various times in Brunei and Singapore.

Sabah
The head of state of Sabah was once known as Yang Di-Pertua Negara and later known as Yang Di-Pertua Negeri.

Singapore

Background
Following revisions to the Constitution in 1959, which granted Singapore self-governance from the United Kingdom, the ceremonial office of Yang di-Pertuan Negara replaced the colonial office of Governor as the representative of the British monarch in Singapore. 

Although the Yang di-Pertuan Negara was the title for the head of state, constitutionally he is only a de jure chief executive, acting as a vice-regal representative in lieu of a typical Governor-General.<ref name="google">The head of state in Singapore: An historical perspective in Managing Political Change in Singapore: The Elected Presidency''', Kevin Tan, Peng Er Lam, Routledge, 1997, page 9</ref> 

Under a transitional arrangement, the last governor of Singapore, Sir William Goode, served as the first Yang di-Pertuan Negara from 3 June 1959 to 3 December 1959. He was succeeded by Yusof Ishak, who was sworn into office on the same day as the country's state flag, coat of arms, and national anthem were adopted.

The title was retained  on 31 August 1963 when Singapore declare unilateral declaration of independence from the UK and after 16 September accession to Malaysia as a state in 1963 (not to be confused with the Yang di-Pertua Negara of Sabah). The officeholder then acted as the vice-regal representative of the Yang di-Pertuan Agong of Malaysia.

On 9 August 1965, Singapore was separated from the federation to become an independent state within the Commonwealth of Nations. On 22 December of that year, the Constitution was amended to make the country a republic, and had changed the title to President with retroactive effect from the date of independence.

List of officeholders
 William Goode (3 June 1959 – 2 December 1959)
 Yusof Ishak (3 December 1959 – 9 August 1965)

Brunei
In Brunei, the Sultan of Brunei is also known as the Yang Di-Pertuan Negara Brunei Darussalam.

The full title for the head of state and head of government of Brunei is Kebawah Duli Yang Maha Mulia Paduka Seri Baginda Sultan dan Yang Di-Pertuan Negara Brunei Darussalam''.

See also
Bendahara

References

Government of Brunei
Government of Malaysia
Political office-holders in Singapore
Sabah
Government of Sabah
Politics of Sabah